Spinach 1 is a 1973 album composed, produced and performed by Giorgio Moroder and Michael Holm under the moniker "Spinach".

Track listing
"America, America" (Giorgio Moroder, Michael Holm) - 3:33
"Rhythm of Love" (Holm, Moroder) - 2:19
"Action Man (Part 1)" (Holm, Moroder) - 3:59
"Knockin' On Your Door" (Holm, Moroder) - 3:16
"(Sweet Sixteen) You Know What I Mean" (Holm, Moroder) - 4:19
"Action Man (Part 2)" (Holm, Moroder) - 3:51
"Looky, Looky" (Moroder, Peter Rainford) - 2:30
"Don't You Worry" (Tom Winter, Abi Ofarim) - 2:30
"I'm a Bum" (Heinz Krebs, Andreas Neumann) - 2:41
"Sunny Mornin'" (Rainer Pietsch, Cannon, Holm) - 3:21
"Sunshine Lady" (Pietsch) - 3:45
"Muny, Muny" (Holm, Joachim Heider) -  3:04

References

Giorgio Moroder albums
1973 albums
Albums produced by Giorgio Moroder
Casablanca Records albums